The Sierra y Cañones de Guara Natural Park (Spanish: Parque natural de la Sierra y los Cañones de Guara) is a Spanish Natural park in the Sierra de Guara mountain range, located in the Province of Huesca, Aragon, northern Spain. It was established in 1990.

Geography 
The nature park covers an area of about 47,450 hectares, not including a peripheral zone of protection that also covers 33,775 hectares.

The park covers the Spanish municipalities of:Abiego, Adahuesca, Aínsa-Sobrarbe, Alquézar, Arguis, Bárcabo, Bierge, Boltaña, Caldearenas, Casbas de Huesca, Colungo, Huesca, Loporzano, Nueno and Sabiñánigo.

Salto de Roldán ('Roland's Leap'), a natural rock formation, lies in the westernmost part of the park. Several legends are associated with it; mainly relating to Roland, the foremost of Charlemagne's paladins.

External links 

Sierra de Guara
Parque Natural de la Sierra y Cañones de Guara
Naturals Parks
Excursion por Huesca

Natural parks of Spain
Protected areas of Aragon
Protected areas of the Pyrenees
Biosphere reserves of Spain
Protected areas established in 1990
1990 establishments in Spain
Canyons and gorges of Spain
Landforms of Aragon